Lachlan Stein is a Scotland international rugby league footballer who plays for the Glebe-Burwood Wolves in the Ron Massey Cup, he has played at representative level for Scotland in the 2017 World Cup, and at club level for Penrith Panthers, as a  , or .

Background
Stein was born in Wollongong, New South Wales, Australia.

Playing career
After playing junior football for the Thirroul Butchers, Stein played for the St George Illawarra Dragons, and the Cronulla-Sutherland Sharks in the 2015 Holden Cup. He then moved to the Penrith Panthers where he played in the NSW Cup.

He was named in the Scottish squad for the 2017 Rugby League World Cup.

In 2019, Stein joined Ron Massey Cup side the Glebe-Burwood Wolves.  On 6 May 2019, Stein was selected for the Ron Massey Cup representative side to play against Newcastle Rebels.

References

External links
2017 RLWC profile

1996 births
Living people
Australian people of Scottish descent
Australian rugby league players
Newtown Jets NSW Cup players
Rugby league centres
Rugby league wingers
Rugby league players from Wollongong
Scotland national rugby league team players